Atypical Solute Carrier Families (Atypical SLCs) are novel plausible secondary active or facilitative transporter proteins that share ancestral background with the known solute carrier families (SLCs). However, they have not been assigned a name according to the SLC root system, or been classified into any of the existing SLC families.

Atypical major facilitator superfamily transport families 
Most atypical SLCs are families within the major facilitator superfamily (MFS). These atypical SLCs are plausible secondary active or facilitative transporter proteins that share ancestry with the known solute carriers. They are, however, not named according to the SLC root system, or classified into any of the existing SLC families. ATMFs are categorised based on their sequence similarity and phylogenetic closeness. 

Some Atypical SLC of MFS type are: OCA2, CLN3, SPNS1, SPNS2, SPNS3, SV2A, SV2B, SV2C, SVOP, SVOPL, MFSD1, MFSD2A, MFSD2B, MFSD3, MFSD4A, MFSD4B, MFSD5, MFSD6, MFSD6L, MFSD8, MFSD9, MFSD10, MFSD11, MFSD12, MFSD13A, MFSD14A, MFSD14B, UNC93A and UNC93B1. All these are atypical SLCs found within the Major facilitator superfamily. Also TMEM104 (APC clan), OCA2 (IT clan) and CLN3 (having no clan) are atypical SLCs in humans.

Non-MFS transport families 
Although most atypical SLCs are from the major facilitator superfamily, there are exceptions: TMEM104 (APC superfamily), OCA2 (IT superfamily) and CLN3 (unknown superfamily).

References 

Solute carrier family